Nizampur may refer to:
 Nizampur, Panipat, Haryana
Nizampur, Amritsar, a village in Punjab, India
Nizampur Gobari, a town in Azamgarh district in the state of Uttar Pradesh, India
Nizampur, Khyber Pakhtunkhwa, a town in Pakistan